The Northern Virginia Independent Athletic Conference, commonly known as NVIAC, is a Northern Virginia-based athletics league; it includes both high school and middle school teams. Founded in 1997, NVIAC is composed of nine member schools or organizations, and one provisional member, Dominion Christian School. NVIAC sports include boys' baseball, boys' and girls' basketball, boys' and girls' cross country, boys' football, boys' and girls' soccer, and girls volleyball. Typically, at the end of the season, a tournament is held for each age group (middle school boys, girls; varsity boys, girls, and occasionally junior varsity boys and girls).

The current president is Tony Pangle of County Christian School.

Organizations

References

External links
 
NVIAC - CSOA
Fairfax Times

1997 establishments in Virginia
High school sports conferences and leagues in the United States
Sports in Northern Virginia
Sports leagues established in 1997